Culture, Society and Masculinities was a peer-reviewed journal first published in early 2009 as the fifth published by Men's Studies Press, and closing at the end of 2016.

Culture, Society and Masculinities complements the field's pioneering and longest running journal, The Journal of Men's Studies. It specifically provides a forum for emergent explorations of themes and scales larger than the strictly psychological, and of perspectives that aim to situate local (micro-ethnographic) findings in broader historical, political and/or sociological frameworks. This means cultural and cross-cultural psychological projects do fit the aims of this new journal. It especially invites work that rethinks or elaborates existing ideas and concepts of globalization and regionalization. Priority is given to reviews and critical discussions, either of theory development or policy trends. Areas of research include:

 cultural psychology 
 cross-cultural and transcultural studies
 cultural, social, historical, comparative and philosophical anthropology 
 ethnic studies 
 postcolonial studies 
 international conflict studies 
 gender policy studies 
 social/human geography 
 media studies; and 
 (art) historical studies.

See also
Gender studies
Men's studies

References

Janssen, Diederik. International guide to literature on masculinity: a bibliography. MPS, March 2008.  (pbk. : alk. paper) --  (electronic)

External links
 Publisher's content pages

Biannual journals
Sociology journals
Publications established in 2009
Men's studies journals
2009 establishments in the United States